Cold Kirby is a village and civil parish in the Ryedale district of North Yorkshire, England. The population at the 2011 census (including Angram Grange) was 205.

References

External links

Villages in North Yorkshire
Civil parishes in North Yorkshire